Solomon Kiri (born 26 October 1972) is a New Zealand former professional rugby league footballer who played in the 1990s and 2000s for the Adelaide Rams and the Western Reds.

New Zealand
Kiri played for the Counties Manukau Heroes in the 1994 Lion Red Cup before joining the Auckland Warriors and playing for the Warriors Colts in the 1995 Lion Red Cup grand final. Kiri also represented the New Zealand Māori rugby league team

Australia
In 1996 Kiri played for the Western Reds, playing two first grade games for the club.

Kiri joined the new Adelaide Rams franchise in the 1997 Super League (Australia) competition and played ten times for the Rams.

Later years
Kiri then returned to New Zealand and played for the Otahuhu Leopards. He represented Auckland and the New Zealand Residents in 2000. Kiri was again selected for New Zealand Māori but did not make the team for the World Cup.

References

External links
Rugby League project

1972 births
Living people
Adelaide Rams players
Auckland rugby league team players
New Zealand rugby league players
New Zealand Māori rugby league players
New Zealand Māori rugby league team players
Otahuhu Leopards players
Counties Manukau rugby league team players
Mangere East Hawks players
Junior Kiwis players
Rugby league centres
Rugby league players from Auckland
Western Reds players